Yanbu, also known simply as Yambu or Yenbo, is a city in the Al Madinah Province of western Saudi Arabia.  It is approximately 300 kilometers northwest of Jeddah (at ). The population is 222,360 (2020 census). Many residents are foreign expatriates working in the oil refineries and petrochemical industry, mostly from Asia, but there are also large numbers from the Middle East, Europe, and North America.

Yanbu has three primary sections; Yanbu Al-Bahr, Yanbu Al-Nakhl and Yanbu Al-Sina'iya as well as a major Red Sea port.

History

Pre-modern era
Yanbu's history dates back at least 2,500 years, when it was a staging point on the spice and incense route from Yemen to Egypt and the Mediterranean region.

Sharm Yanbu, historically known as Charmuthas, which is a small peninsula located to the north of Yanbu was mentioned by the Greek historian Diodorus Siculus.

The Invasion of Dul Ashir took place in Yanbu two or three months after prophet Muhammad's return from Buwat. He appointed Abu Salamah Ibn Abd al-Assad to take his place in Medina while he was away commanding another raid. Between 150 and 200 followers joined this operation to al-Ushayra, Yanbu in either the month of Jumada al-awwal or Jumada al-Thani.

They had 30 camels that they rode upon by turns. When they arrived at al-Usharayh, they expected to raid a rich Meccan caravan heading towards Syria led by Abu Sufyan. Muhammad already had the knowledge of this caravan’s departure from Mecca and waited for about a month for this caravan to pass. But the Meccan caravan had already passed.

In this operation, Muhammad entered into an alliance with Banu Madlaj, a tribe inhabiting the vicinity of al-Ushayra. He also concluded another treaty that was made with Banu Damrah previously. All those treaties established good political connections for him.

Modern era
Yanbu served as a supply and operational base for Arab and British forces fighting the Ottoman Empire during World War I. On July 27, 1916 the Ottoman garrison surrendered in the Capture of Yanbu to the Arab revolutionary forces. It remained a small port town until 1975, when the Saudi government designated it as one of the country's two new industrial centers (the other being Al Jubayl on the ). Extensive government and private development have taken place at the port and surrounding area, which is based on the petrochemical industry.

Geography 
The city is divided into three primary sections, which are located about fifteen minutes (drive by car) away from each other. Yanbu is the second-largest Saudi Arabian city by the Red Sea, after Jeddah.

Yanbu Al-Bahr 

(Also known as Yanbu Al-Bahar) is the most northern part of Yanbu. The downtown area of Yanbu Al-Bahr (which is also called Al-Balad) contains most of the population. Most of the restaurants here cater to the various ethnic groups in the area, although some also cater to residents in the Royal Commission. The area also contains some international chain restaurants, as well as some coffee shops. There is also a shopping mall and various shopping centers located here as well. The Holiday Inn Hotel and Novotel Hotel is located at the edge of this area, as is Yanbu Airport. Arabian Homes also have a gated private residential community compound catering to the expat population, and is located next to the Holiday Inn. Most of the residents tend to be lower and middle-class Saudi citizens, and well as mostly South Asian and lower and middle-class Arab and other Middle Eastern expatriates. Every year there is a flower festival at the outskirts of Yanbu that has attracted many viewers around Saudi Arabia and neighboring countries.

Currently, the government is attempting to improve the old, historical area in downtown Yanbu, as many historical buildings are located there. Many are still in a serious state of disrepair. While most of Yanbu Al-Balad has a rather old, worn-out feel to it, parts of the city, particularly at the edges of the city, are starting to modernize, as new shopping centers, as well as a new shopping mall, have been built. Jarir Bookstore had also opened a branch in Yanbu Al-Balad.

Yanbu Al-Nakhal
(The Palms) is a separate area, some 47 kilometers from the city (according to Google Maps), that has more than 20 villages such as Jabriyya, Suwaiq, Raihan, Mesharif, Ain-Ajlan, Madsos, Alnejil and Talaat Nazah, where mostly farms would be found. Currently (July 2018), most of the residents are local tribes, mostly from Johainah (Aljohani), Harb (Alharbi), and few from Ashraf. There are also some foreign nationals, mostly from south and east Asia, as well as some expatriate Arabs. Some of the local Saudis work on their own farms and trade in sheep and camels. The most notable village in Yanbu Al Nakhal is Jabriyya, where the local government office for the town is located. The village has a general hospital, a bank, three ATM machines, four well-serviced filling stations, a fire station, two notable malls, several recreational facilities among other things. The locals are very friendly and cordial in greetings and offering help. There is almost everything you need for basic livelihood in the neighborhood, however, the options for residents pales in comparison to both the Royal Commission and Yanbu Al Bahr. The Radwah Mountain is very visible anywhere in the town.

However, the town has neither hotels nor international schools, and locals and expatriates seeking foreign education for their children had to send them to international schools in the main city center, Yanbu Al Bahr, or in the Royal Commission.

Yanbu Al-Sina'iya
Yanbu Al-Sina'iya (literally "the industrial Yanbu") is the industrial city, established in 1975 by royal decree to create a Royal Commission to manage the effort to build a new modern city. It is the southernmost part of Yanbu city. Yanbu Al-Sina'iya is divided into two parts, the industrial area to the south, and a residential area (referred to as the Royal Commission by many locals) directly north and adjacent to the industrial area. The industrial area within Yanbu Al-Sina'iya is the area of all the major refineries and petrochemical installations and is still undergoing major growth. This area of Yanbu was a strip of undeveloped coastal desert land on the Red Sea and has been transformed into an industrial city.

Yanbu Al-Sina'iya's residential section is near the Royal Commission Headquarters. It has amenities such as many international chain and local restaurants, two shopping malls, various shopping centers, supermarkets of various sizes, hospitals, banks, and coffee shops. The Moevenpick Hotel, Yanbu's newest hotel, is located here, as is The Cove, a gated private residential housing compound built around a large private lagoon. Yanbu Al Sinaiyah is home to Yanbu Industrial College, created for training and imparting knowledge for the students and workforce of the industry. Yanbu International School was also located here, prior to its closing in 2018.

The majority of Yanbu's Western expatriate population is found living in the Royal Commission. The rest of the residents of Yanbu Al-Sina'iya tend to be upper-middle and upper-class Saudi citizens, upper-class Asians, and upper-class Arab and Middle Eastern residents. The residential area of Yanbu Al-Sina'iya has a more modern, clean, and organized feel to it than the downtown area. It is also greener.

A new waterfront project has been launched in the coastline of Yanbu Industrial City. The total area of this project is 12 km. The project consists of four phases. The first phase is made of a campground equipped with the needed facilities. The second phase is made up of gardens, marina and a number of islands. The third phase has a recreation area, hotel and other facilities. The fourth phase has an aquarium.

Climate 
Yanbu has a hot desert climate (Köppen climate classification BWh) with very hot summer like weather year round.

Economy 
Yanbu is an important petroleum shipping terminal and is home to three oil refineries, a plastics facility and several other petrochemical plants. It is the country's second port (after Jeddah) and serves as the main port for the holy city of Medina,  to the east. The natural harbour is protected on both sides by wide coral reefs. These reefs remain mostly untouched, making them excellent areas for diving. Three major oil pipelines lead across the desert from the oilfields in the east to terminate at the Red Sea in Yanbu.

Education

For higher education, the city has several universities and colleges, including the following:
 College of Computer Science & Engineering at Yanbu (CCSEY): Which belongs to Taibah University
 Yanbu Industrial College
 Yanbu University College

Yanbu is also home to several primary, intermediate and secondary schools such as:

 Al-Isra International School
 Al Manar International School -Yanbu
 Al Tawhid International School
 Naba'a Al-Maarifa Private Schools
 Radhwa International School Yanbu
 Yanbu Elite International School
 Yanbu International School (closed as of July 31, 2018)

Hospitals

 Al Ansari Hospital - Royal Commission
 Yanbu National Hospital - Royal Commission
 Royal Commission Medical Center Royal Commission Hospital - Yanbu

Tourism

Although the city is known for its industrial activities, it is now growing as a touristic destination. The beach is used for scuba-diving as well as swimming and relaxing in front of the white sandy shores. It has a very big beach called the "China herbal park ", which is approximately 4 km² in size.

In 2020, Saudi Arabia's tourism ministry decided to renovate T. E. Lawrence's house in Yanbu, the British officer who captured the city during World War I.

Transportation

Airport 

Yanbu has an international airport (code YNB) that was upgraded in 2009. It only offers flights to Dammam, Jeddah, and Riyadh within Saudi Arabia. 
Internationally, it offers flights to Alexandria and Cairo in Egypt, Istanbul in Turkey, and Dubai and Sharjah in the United Arab Emirates.

All the international destinations are serviced by foreign airlines; domestic carriers Saudia and Flynas only serve the domestic destinations listed above.

Highways 
A highway passes through Yanbu, linking Yanbu to Jeddah in the south, and to the northern parts of the kingdom as well as to neighboring countries like Syria, Jordan, etc., in the north.

Yanbu Commercial Port 

It is one of the oldest sea ports along the Red Sea. The port is connected to the holy cities, especially the one in Madinah. Moreover, it has an economic importance as it located in an economically vital area. It also receives pilgrims.

See also
Saudi Ports Authority
2004 Yanbu attack
Battle of Yanbu or Yanbu Landing
Yanbu University College
Yanbu Industrial College
Yanbu International School (YIS), a United States-accredited school
Al Tawhid International School

References

External links

 General information on Yanbu
 Royal Commission for Jubail and Yanbu

Video
    City of Yanbu  
  Palm Beach at Yanbu  
  Yanbu sunrise  
   Types and prices of fish in Yanbu 

 
Populated places in Medina Province (Saudi Arabia)
Port cities and towns in Saudi Arabia
Port cities and towns of the Red Sea